Paragynoxys regis is a species of flowering plant in the family Asteraceae. It is found only in Ecuador. Its natural habitat is high Andean forest (2,500–3,500 m). It is threatened by habitat loss.

References

regis
Flora of Ecuador
Vulnerable plants
Taxonomy articles created by Polbot